Silicone foam is a synthetic rubber product used in gasketing, sheets and firestops. It is available in solid, cured form as well as in individual liquid components for field installations.

Uses
Gaskets
Sheets
High temperature tubes for autoclaves
Firestops
Surfactants

Vulcanisation
When the constituent components of silicone foam are mixed together, they evolve hydrogen gas, which causes bubbles to form within the rubber, as it changes from liquid to solid. This results in an outward pressure. Temperature and humidity can influence the rate of expansion.

See also
Firestop
Vulcanisation
Rubber
Silicone resin

External links

YouTube video showing silicone foam being mixed and expanded
Silicone foam used as high temperature tube for autoclave
Stockwell Elastomerics silicone foam used in gasketing
Silicone Engineering Silicone Foam used in Rail and Mass Transit Systems
Silicone sponge sheets
Silicone foam surfactant, the Marangioni effect on cell stabilisation
Silicone foam without use of toxic blowing agents

Foams
Rubber
Passive fire protection
Firestops